BYD K10MR is an electric bus built specifically for RTD's 16th Street Mall service, called Free MallRide, in Denver, CO.

Design
The BYD K10MR is a modified version of the BYD K10M.  The bus has 3 boarding doors and is right-hand drive.

Denver RTD 
In August 2015, RTD approved a contract for up to $27.1 million to purchase a fleet of 36 all-electric buses from BYD. At the end of August 2016, the first new BYD bus was introduced at an early-morning media event, and to the public later in the day, with transition to the new electric bus fleet expected in the coming weeks.

References

External links 
 RTD Free MallRide Official Website

Buses of the United States
Low-floor buses
Battery electric buses
K10MR